Horst Mattern (born 4 November 1943) is a West German sprint canoer who competed from the late 1960s to the mid-1970s. He won two silver medals in the K-4 10000 m event at the ICF Canoe Sprint World Championships, earning them in 1970 and 1973.

Mattern also competed in two Summer Olympics, earning his best finish of eighth in the K-2 1000 m event at Munich in 1972.

References

Sports-reference.com profile

1943 births
Canoeists at the 1968 Summer Olympics
Canoeists at the 1972 Summer Olympics
German male canoeists
Living people
Olympic canoeists of West Germany
ICF Canoe Sprint World Championships medalists in kayak